Betta waseri is a species of gourami endemic to Peninsular Malaysia.  It is an inhabitant of well shaded blackwater streams and in peat forests with plentiful organic debris and root growth.  This species grows to a length of  SL. The specific name honours the leader of the expedition on which the type of this species, the German aquarist Alfred Waser.

References

waseri
Fish of Asia
Taxa named by René Krummenacher
Fish described in 1986